Runtime error detection is a software verification method that analyzes a software application as it executes and reports defects that are detected during that execution. It can be applied during unit testing, component testing, integration testing,  system testing (automated/scripted or manual), or penetration testing.

Runtime error detection can identify defects that manifest themselves only at runtime (for example, file overwrites) and zeroing in on the root causes of the application crashing, running slowly, or behaving unpredictably. Defects commonly detected by runtime error detection include:
 Race conditions
 Exceptions
 Resource leaks
 Memory leaks
 Security attack vulnerabilities (e.g., SQL injection)
 Null pointers
 Uninitialized memory
 Buffer overflows

Runtime error detection tools can only detect errors in the executed control flow of the application.

See also
 Development Testing
 Software testing
 Memory debugger
 BoundsChecker
 Runtime verification

References

Software testing